Sarah Burch is a Canadian environmental scientist who is Canada Research Chair at the University of Waterloo. Her research considers strategies to respond to climate change at the community scale. She is a lead author for the IPCC Sixth Assessment Report.

Early life and education 
Burch studied international relationships and environmental sciences at the University of Calgary. She was a doctoral researcher at the University of British Columbia, before moving to the United Kingdom as a postdoctoral researcher, where she worked at the University of Oxford.

Research and career 
In 2013, Burch returned to Canada, where she joined the faculty at the University of Waterloo. She worked as an Assistant Professor and coordinated research fellows for the Earth System Governance Project. In 2015, Burch was appointed a Canada Research Chair in Sustainability Governance. Her research considers strategies to mitigate the impact of climate change in communities. In particular, she has studied how small businesses can contribute to global efforts for sustainability. By investigating inertia built into urban planning and governance, Burch hopes to understand the origins of carbon-intensive developments. Burch works as the Director of the Sustainability Policy Research on Urban Transformations (SPROUT) Lab. She was involved with delivering the world's first massive open online course on climate change.

After contributing to the IPCC Fourth Assessment Report, Burch was made a lead author on the IPCC Sixth Assessment Report. When the IPCC Sixth Assessment Report reported its findings in 2022, Burch explained that to avoid a climate catastrophe, the world had three years to reduce emissions.

Awards and honours 
 2017 Royal Society of Canada College of New Scholars
 2018 Canada's Top 40 Under 40

Selected publications

References 

Living people
Year of birth missing (living people)
Place of birth missing (living people)
Environmental scientists
21st-century Canadian scientists
21st-century Canadian women scientists
Canada Research Chairs
Academic staff of the University of Waterloo
University of Calgary alumni
University of British Columbia alumni